This is a list of the seasons played by ADO Den Haag from 1956 when the club entered the Eredivisie, the club was established in 1905, to the most recent seasons. The club's achievements in all major national and international competitions as well as the top scorers are listed.

ADO Den Haag have won the Netherlands Football League Championship two times; both of them before the start of the Eredivisie. The club have also won the KNVB Cup twice.

Key

Key to league record:
P – Played
W – Games won
D – Games drawn
L – Games lost
F – Goals for
A – Goals against
Pts – Points
Pos – Final position

Key to rounds:
Prel. – Preliminary round
QR1 – First qualifying round
QR2 – Second qualifying round, etc.
Inter – Intermediate round (between qualifying rounds and rounds proper)
GS – Group stage
1R – First round
2R – Second round, etc.
R64 – 1/32 Final (round of 64)
R32 – 1/16 Final (round of 32)
R16 – 1/8 Final (round of 16)
QF – Quarter-final
SF – Semi-final
F – Final
W – Winners
DNE – Did not enter

Key to competitions
 JCS – Johan Cruyff Shield
 EC – European Cup (1955–1992)
 UCL – UEFA Champions League (1992–present)
 CWC – UEFA Cup Winners' Cup (1960–1999)
 UC – UEFA Cup (1971–2009)
 UEL – UEFA Europa League (2009–present)
 USC – UEFA Super Cup
 FCWC – FIFA Club World Cup

Seasons from 1956 to present

Notes

References 

 
 
 
 
 
 

ADO Den Haag
ADO Den Haag